Belgium competed at the 1936 Winter Olympics in Garmisch-Partenkirchen, Germany.

Alpine skiing

Men

Bobsleigh

Figure skating

Women

Pairs

Ice hockey

Group C
Top two teams advanced to semifinals

Speed skating

Men

References

 Olympic Winter Games 1936, full results by sports-reference.com

Nations at the 1936 Winter Olympics
1936
Olympics, Winter